John Tracy is an American television director.

His career began in 1969 serving as one of the associate directors of What's My Line?. He then went on to direct episodes of The Electric Company, Angie, Laverne & Shirley, Joanie Loves Chachi, Who's the Boss?, Full House, Newhart, Remington Steele, Family Matters, Yes, Dear, Still Standing and Growing Pains, directing 134 episodes out of the 166 of the series.

References

External links
 

American television directors
Living people
Place of birth missing (living people)
Year of birth missing (living people)